Tony Lomack (born April 27, 1968) is a former American football wide receiver. He played for the Los Angeles Rams in 1990 and for the Phoenix Cardinals in 1991.

References

1968 births
Living people
American football wide receivers
Florida Gators football players
Los Angeles Rams players
Phoenix Cardinals players